Sloane Elmo Farrington (17 May 1923 – 1997) was a Bahamian competitive sailor and Olympic medalist. He won a bronze medal in the Star class at the 1956 Summer Olympics in Melbourne, together with Durward Knowles. He also won gold in the 1959 Pan American Games star class (with Durward Knowles). He had previously represented Great Britain at the 1948 Summer Olympics.

References

External links
 

1923 births
1997 deaths
Sportspeople from Nassau, Bahamas
Bahamian male sailors (sport)
British male sailors (sport)
Sailors at the 1948 Summer Olympics – Star
Sailors at the 1952 Summer Olympics – Star
Sailors at the 1956 Summer Olympics – Star
Sailors at the 1960 Summer Olympics – Star
Olympic sailors of Great Britain
Olympic sailors of the Bahamas
Olympic bronze medalists for the Bahamas
Olympic medalists in sailing
Sailors at the 1959 Pan American Games
Pan American Games gold medalists for the Bahamas
Pan American Games medalists in sailing
Medalists at the 1956 Summer Olympics
Medalists at the 1959 Pan American Games